Inola is a genus of Australian nursery web spiders that was first described by V. T. Davies in 1982.<ref name=Davi1982>{{cite journal| last=Davies| first=V. T.| year=1982| title=Inola nov. gen., a web-building pisaurid (Araneae: Pisauridae) from northern Australia with descriptions of three species| journal=Memoirs of the Queensland Museum| pages=479–487| volume=20}}</ref>

Species
 it contains four species, found only in Queensland:Inola amicabilis Davies, 1982 (type) – Australia (Queensland)Inola cracentis Davies, 1982 – Australia (Queensland)Inola daviesae Tio & Humphrey, 2010 – Australia (Queensland)Inola subtilis'' Davies, 1982 – Australia (Queensland)

See also
 List of Pisauridae species

References

Araneomorphae genera
Pisauridae
Spiders of Australia
Taxa named by Valerie Todd Davies